Redneck is a derogatory term chiefly, but not exclusively, applied to white Americans perceived to be crass and unsophisticated, closely associated with rural whites of the Southern United States. 

Its meaning possibly stems from the sunburn found on farmers' necks dating back to the late 19th century.  Its modern usage is similar in meaning to cracker (especially regarding Texas, Georgia, and Florida), hillbilly (especially regarding Appalachia and the Ozarks), and white trash (but without the last term's suggestions of immorality). In Britain, the Cambridge Dictionary definition states: "A poor, white person without education, esp. one living in the countryside in the southern US, who is believed to have prejudiced ideas and beliefs. This word is usually considered offensive." People from the white South sometimes jocularly call themselves "rednecks" as insider humor.

By the 1970s, the term had become offensive slang, its meaning expanded to include racism, loutishness, and opposition to modern ways.

Patrick Huber, in his monograph A Short History of Redneck: The Fashioning of a Southern White Masculine Identity, emphasized the theme of masculinity in the 20th-century expansion of the term, noting, "The redneck has been stereotyped in the media and popular culture as a poor, dirty, uneducated, and racist Southern white man."

19th and early 20th centuries

Political term for poor farmers
The term originally characterized farmers that had a red neck, caused by sunburn from long hours working in the fields. A citation from 1893 provides a definition as "poorer inhabitants of the rural districts ... men who work in the field, as a matter of course, generally have their skin stained red and burnt by the sun, and especially is this true of the back of their necks". Hats were usually worn and they protected that wearer's head from the sun, but also provided psychological protection by shading the face from close scrutiny. The back of the neck however was more exposed to the sun and allowed closer scrutiny about the person's background in the same way callused working hands could not be easily covered.

By 1900, "rednecks" was in common use to designate the political factions inside the Democratic Party comprising poor white farmers in the South. The same group was also often called the "wool hat boys" (for they opposed the rich men, who wore expensive silk hats). A newspaper notice in Mississippi in August 1891 called on rednecks to rally at the polls at the upcoming primary election:

By 1910, the political supporters of the Mississippi Democratic Party politician James K. Vardaman—chiefly poor white farmers—began to describe themselves proudly as "rednecks", even to the point of wearing red neckerchiefs to political rallies and picnics.

Linguist Sterling Eisiminger, based on the testimony of informants from the Southern United States, speculated that the prevalence of pellagra in the region during the Great Depression may have contributed to the rise in popularity of the term; red, inflamed skin is one of the first symptoms of that disorder to appear.

Coal miners
The term "redneck" in the early 20th century was occasionally used in reference to American coal miner union members who wore red bandanas for solidarity.  The sense of "a union man" dates at least to the 1910s and was especially popular during the 1920s and 1930s in the coal-producing regions of West Virginia, Kentucky, and Pennsylvania. It was also used by union strikers to describe poor white strikebreakers.

Late 20th and early 21st centuries

Writers Edward Abbey and Dave Foreman also use "redneck" as a political call to mobilize poor rural white Southerners. "In Defense of the Redneck" was a popular essay by Ed Abbey. One popular early Earth First! bumper sticker was "Rednecks for Wilderness". Murray Bookchin, an urban leftist and social ecologist, objected strongly to Earth First!'s use of the term as "at the very least, insensitive". However, many Southerners have proudly embraced the term as a self-identifier. Similarly to Earth First!'s use, the self-described "anti-racist, pro-gun, pro-labor" group Redneck Revolt have used the term to signal its roots in the rural white working-class and celebration of what member Max Neely described as "redneck culture".

As political epithet
According to Chapman and Kipfer in their "Dictionary of American Slang", by 1975 the term had expanded in meaning beyond the poor Southerner to refer to "a bigoted and conventional person, a loutish ultra-conservative". For example, in 1960 John Bartlow Martin expressed Senator John F. Kennedy should not enter the Indiana Democratic presidential primary because the state was "redneck conservative country".  Indiana, he told Kennedy, was a state "suspicious of foreign entanglements, conservative in fiscal policy, and with a strong overlay of Southern segregationist sentiment".  Writer William Safire observes it is often used to attack white Southern conservatives, and more broadly to degrade working class and rural whites that are perceived by urban progressives to be insufficiently progressive. At the same time, some white Southerners have reclaimed the word, using it with pride and defiance as a self-identifier.

In popular culture
Johnny Russell was nominated for a Grammy Award in 1973 for his recording of "Rednecks, White Socks and Blue Ribbon Beer", parlaying the "common touch" into financial and critical success.
Further songs referencing rednecks include "Longhaired Redneck" by David Allan Coe, "Rednecks" by Randy Newman, "Redneck Friend" by Jackson Browne,  "Redneck Woman" by Gretchen Wilson, "Redneck Yacht Club" by  Craig Morgan, "Redneck" by Lamb of God, "Redneck Crazy" by Tyler Farr, "Red Neckin' Love Makin' Night" by Conway Twitty, "Up Against The Wall Redneck Mother" by Jerry Jeff Walker, and "Your Redneck Past" by Ben Folds Five. 
'Picture to Burn' by Taylor Swift is another successful country song using the word 'redneck', this time in a negative way, where the narrator calls her ex-boyfriend a 'redneck heartbreak'. 
Frank Zappa's song "Lonesome Cowboy Bert" which appeared on the soundtrack of "200 Motels" performed by The Mothers used the term. 
Comedian Jeff Foxworthy's 1993 comedy album You Might Be a Redneck If... cajoled listeners to evaluate their own behavior in the context of stereotypical redneck behavior. 
Redneck is mentioned several times on Texas-based animated sitcom King of the Hill by Hank Hill's antagonistic neighbor Kahn.

Outside the United States

Historical Scottish Covenanter usage
In Scotland in the 1640s, the Covenanters rejected rule by bishops, often signing manifestos using their own blood. Some wore red cloth around their neck to signify their position, and were called rednecks by the Scottish ruling class to denote that they were the rebels in what came to be known as The Bishop's War that preceded the rise of Cromwell. Eventually, the term began to mean simply "Presbyterian", especially in communities along the Scottish border. Because of the large number of Scottish immigrants in the pre-revolutionary American South, some historians have suggested that this may be the origin of the term in the United States.

Dictionaries document the earliest American citation of the term's use for Presbyterians in 1830, as "a name bestowed upon the Presbyterians of Fayetteville (North Carolina)".

South Africa
The exact Afrikaans equivalent, is used as a disparaging term for English people and South Africans of English descent, in reference to their supposed naïveté as later arrivals in the region in failing to protect themselves from the sun.

See also
 Florida cracker
 Georgia cracker
 Old Stock Americans
 Stereotypes of white Americans
 Culture of the Southern United States
 Country (identity)
 List of ethnic slurs
 Class discrimination
 Bogan, Australian  term
 Plain Folk of the Old South
 Redlegs – poor whites that live on Barbados and a few other Caribbean islands
 Yokel
 White trash

References

Further reading
 Abbey, Edward. "In Defense of the Redneck", from Abbey's Road: Take the Other. (E. P. Dutton, 1979)
 Ferrence, Matthew, "You Are and You Ain't: Story and Literature as Redneck Resistance", Journal of Appalachian Studies, 18 (2012), 113–30.
 Goad, Jim. The Redneck Manifesto: How Hillbillies, Hicks, and White Trash Became America's Scapegoats (Simon & Schuster, 1997).
 Harkins, Anthony. Hillbilly: A cultural history of an American icon (2003).
 Huber, Patrick.   "A short history of Redneck: The fashioning of a southern white masculine identity." Southern Cultures 1#2 (1995): 145–166. online
 Jarosz, Lucy, and Victoria Lawson. "'Sophisticated people versus rednecks': Economic restructuring and class difference in America's West." Antipode 34#1 (2002): 8-27.
 Shirley, Carla D. "'You might be a redneck if ... ' Boundary Work among Rural, Southern Whites." Social forces 89#1 (2010): 35–61. in JSTOR
 West, Stephen A. From Yeoman to Redneck in the South Carolina Upcountry, 1850–1915 (2008)
 Weston, Ruth D. "The Redneck Hero in the Postmodern World", South Carolina Review, (Spring 1993)
 Wilson, Charles R. and William Ferris, eds. Encyclopedia of Southern Culture, (1989)
 Wray, Matt. Not Quite White: White Trash and the Boundaries of Whiteness (2006)

External links

Poor Whites in the New Georgia Encyclopedia (history)

American regional nicknames
American slang
English words
European-American culture in Appalachia
Florida culture
Georgia (U.S. state) culture
History of subcultures
Pejorative terms for white people
Rural culture in the United States
Slang of the Southern United States
Socioeconomic stereotypes
Stereotypes of rural people
Stereotypes of the working class
Stereotypes of white Americans
Texas culture
Working-class culture in the United States